The Congress of Berlin (13 June – 13 July 1878) was a diplomatic conference to reorganise the states in the Balkan Peninsula after the Russo-Turkish War of 1877–78, which had been won by Russia against the Ottoman Empire. Represented at the meeting were Europe's then six great powers: Russia, Great Britain, France, Austria-Hungary, Italy, and Germany; the Ottomans; and four Balkan states: Greece, Serbia, Romania and Montenegro. The congress concluded with the signing of the Treaty of Berlin, replacing the preliminary Treaty of San Stefano that had been signed three months earlier.

The leader of the congress, German Chancellor Otto von Bismarck, sought to stabilise the Balkans, reduce the role of the defeated Ottoman Empire in the region, and balance the distinct interests of Britain, Russia and Austria-Hungary. He also wanted to avoid domination of the Balkans by Russia or the formation of a Greater Bulgaria, and to keep Constantinople in Ottoman hands. Finally Bismarck wanted to encourage the development of civil rights for Jews in the region. Under Bismarck's influence, the congress stripped the Ottomans of many of their European possessions, but refused to grant them to Russia and massively reduced the gains of Bulgaria (compared to the Principality of Bulgaria envisaged by the preliminary San Stefano treaty).

The affected territories were instead granted varying degrees of independence. Romania became fully independent, though was forced to give part of Bessarabia to Russia, and gained Northern Dobruja. Serbia and Montenegro were also granted full independence but lost territory, with Austria-Hungary occupying the Sandžak region along with Bosnia and Herzegovina. Britain took possession of Cyprus. Of the territory that remained within the Ottoman Empire, Bulgaria was made a semi-independent principality, Eastern Rumelia became a special administration, and the region of Macedonia was returned to the Ottomans on condition of reforms to its governance.

The results were initially hailed as a success for peace in the region, but most of the participants were not satisfied with the outcome. The Ottomans were humiliated and had their weakness confirmed as the "sick man of Europe". Russia resented the lack of rewards, despite having won the war that the conference was supposed to resolve, and humiliated by the other great powers in their rejection of the San Stefano settlement. Serbia, Bulgaria and Greece all received far less than they thought they deserved, especially Bulgaria which was left with less than half of the territory envisioned by the Treaty of San Stefano. Bismarck became hated by Russian nationalists and Pan-Slavists, and later found that he had tied Germany too closely to Austria-Hungary in the Balkans. Although Austria-Hungary gained substantial territory, this angered the South Slavs and led to decades of tensions in Bosnia and Herzegovina, culminating in the assassination of Archduke Franz Ferdinand.

In the long term, the settlement led to rising tensions between Russia and Austria-Hungary, and disputes over nationalism in the Balkans. Grievances with the results of the congress festered until they exploded in the First and Second Balkan Wars (1912 and 1913 respectively). Continuing nationalism in the Balkans was one of the causes of the First World War in 1914.

Background

In the decades leading up to the congress, Russia and the Balkans had been gripped by Pan-Slavism, a movement to unite all the Balkan Slavs under one rule. The Treaty of San Stefano, which had created a "Greater Bulgaria", was opposed as a display of Pan-Slavic hegemonic ambition in southeastern Europe. In Imperial Russia, Pan-Slavism meant the creation of a unified Slavic state, under Russian direction, and was essentially a byword for Russian conquest of the Balkan peninsula. The realisation of the goal would have given Russia control of the Dardanelles and the Bosphorus, thus economic control of the Black Sea and substantially greater geopolitical power. That desire evolved similarly to the Pan-Germanism and Pan-Italianism, which had resulted in two unifications, took different forms in the various Slavic nations. 

Balkan Slavs felt they needed both an equivalent to Piedmont to serve as a base and an outside sponsor corresponding to France. The state that was meant to serve as the locus for unification of the Balkans under a "Slavic" rule was not always clear, as initiative wafted between Serbia and Bulgaria. Italian rhetoric by contrast cast Romania as Latin, a "second Piedmont".

The recognition of the Bulgarian Exarchate by the Ottomans in 1870 had been intended to separate the Bulgarians, religiously from the Greek patriarch, and politically from Serbia. Pan-Slavism required the end of Ottoman rule in the Balkans. How and whether that goal would be realised was the major question to be answered at the Congress of Berlin.

Great powers in Balkans
The Balkans were a major stage for competition between the European great powers in the second half of the 19th century. Britain and Russia had interests in the fate of the Balkans. Russia was interested in the region, both ideologically, as a pan-Slavist unifier, and practically, to secure greater control of the Mediterranean. Britain was interested in preventing Russia from accomplishing its goals. Furthermore, the Unifications of Italy and of Germany had stymied the ability of a third European power, Austria-Hungary, to expand its domain to the southwest any further. Germany, as the most powerful continental nation since the 1871 Franco-Prussian War had little direct interest in the settlement and so was the only power that could mediate the Balkan question credibly.

Russia and Austria-Hungary, the two powers that were most invested in the fate of the Balkans, were allied with Germany in the conservative League of Three Emperors, which had been founded to preserve the monarchies of Continental Europe. The Congress of Berlin was thus mainly a dispute among supposed allies of Bismarck and his German Empire, the arbiter of the discussion, would thus have to choose before the end of the congress which of their allies to support. That decision was to have direct consequences on the future of European geopolitics.

Ottoman brutality in the Serbian–Ottoman War and the violent suppression of the Herzegovina Uprising fomented political pressure within Russia, which saw itself as the protector of the Serbs, to act against the Ottoman Empire. David MacKenzie wrote that "sympathy for the Serbian Christians existed in Court circles, among nationalist diplomats, and in the lower classes, and was actively expressed through the Slav committees".

Eventually, Russia sought and obtained Austria-Hungary's pledge of benevolent neutrality in the coming war, in return for ceding Bosnia Herzegovina to Austria-Hungary in the Budapest Convention of 1877. act: The Berlin Congress in effect postponed resolution of the Bosnian question and left Bosnia and Herzegovina under Habsburg control. This was the goal of Hungarian Count Gyula Andrássy.

Treaty of San Stefano

After the Bulgarian April Uprising in 1876 and the Russian victory in the Russo-Turkish War in 1877–1878, Russia had liberated almost all of the Ottoman European possessions. The Ottomans recognised Montenegro, Romania and Serbia as independent, and the territories of all three of them were expanded. Russia created a large Principality of Bulgaria as an autonomous vassal of the sultan. That expanded Russia's sphere of influence to encompass the entire Balkans, which alarmed other powers in Europe. Britain, which had threatened war with Russia if it occupied Constantinople, and France did not want another power meddling in either the Mediterranean or the Middle East, where both powers were prepared to make large colonial gains. Austria-Hungary desired Habsburg control over the Balkans, and Germany wanted to prevent its ally from going to war. German Chancellor Otto von Bismarck thus called the Congress of Berlin to discuss the partition of the Ottoman Balkans among the European powers and to preserve the League of Three Emperors in the face of the spread of European liberalism.

The Congress was attended by Britain, Austria-Hungary, France, Germany, Italy, Russia and the Ottoman Empire. Delegates from Greece, Romania, Serbia and Montenegro attended the sessions that concerned their states, but they were not members.

The Congress was solicited by Russia's rivals, particularly Austria-Hungary and Britain, and was hosted in 1878 by Bismarck. It proposed and ratified the Treaty of Berlin. The meetings were held at Bismarck's Reich Chancellery, the former Radziwill Palace, from 13 June to 13 July 1878. The congress revised or eliminated 18 of the 29 articles in the Treaty of San Stefano. Furthermore, by using as a foundation the Treaties of Paris (1856) and of Washington (1871), the treaty rearranged the East.

Other powers' fear of Russian influence

The principal mission of the participants at the Congress was to deal a fatal blow to the burgeoning movement of pan-Slavism. The movement caused serious concern in Berlin and even more so in Vienna, which was afraid that the repressed Slavic nationalities would revolt against the Habsburgs. The British and the French governments were nervous about both the diminishing influence of the Ottoman Empire and the cultural expansion of Russia to the south, where both Britain and France were poised to colonise Egypt and Palestine. By the Treaty of San Stefano, the Russians, led by Chancellor Alexander Gorchakov, had managed to create in Bulgaria an autonomous principality, under the nominal rule of the Ottoman Empire.

That sparked the Great Game, the massive British fear of the growing Russian influence in the Middle East. The new principality, including a very large portion of Macedonia as well as access to the Aegean Sea, could easily threaten the Dardanelles Straits, which separate the Black Sea from the Mediterranean Sea. 

The arrangement was not acceptable to the British, who considered the entire Mediterranean to be a British sphere of influence and saw any Russian attempt to gain access there as a grave threat to British power. On 4 June, before the Congress opened on 13 June, British Prime Minister Lord Beaconsfield had already concluded the Cyprus Convention, a secret alliance with the Ottomans against Russia in which Britain was allowed to occupy the strategically-placed island of Cyprus. The agreement predetermined Beaconsfield's position during the Congress and led him to issue threats to unleash a war against Russia if it did not comply with Ottoman demands. 

Negotiations between Austro-Hungarian Foreign Minister Gyula Andrássy and British Foreign Secretary Marquess of Salisbury had already "ended on 6 June by Britain agreeing to all the Austrian proposals relative to Bosnia-Herzegovina about to come before the congress while Austria would support British demands".

Bismarck as host

The Congress of Berlin is frequently viewed as the culmination of the battle between Chancellors Alexander Gorchakov of Russia and Otto von Bismarck of Germany. Both were able to persuade other European leaders that a free and independent Bulgaria would greatly improve the security risks posed by a disintegrating Ottoman Empire. According to historian Erich Eyck, Bismarck supported Russia's position that "Turkish rule over a Christian community (Bulgaria) was an anachronism which undoubtedly gave rise to insurrection and bloodshed and should therefore be ended". He used the Great Eastern Crisis of 1875 as proof of growing animosity in the region.

Bismarck's ultimate goal during the Congress of Berlin was not to upset Germany's status on the international platform. He did not wish to disrupt the League of the Three Emperors by choosing between Russia and Austria as an ally. To maintain peace in Europe, Bismarck sought to convince other European diplomats that dividing up the Balkans would foster greater stability. During the process, Russia began to feel cheated despite eventually gaining independence for Bulgaria. Problems in the alliances in Europe before the First World War were thus noticeable.

One reason that Bismarck was able to mediate the various tensions at the Congress of Berlin was his diplomatic persona. He sought peace and stability when international affairs did not pertain to Germany directly. Since he viewed the current situation in Europe as favourable for Germany, any conflicts between the major European powers that threatened the status quo was against German interests. Also, at the Congress of Berlin, "Germany could not look for any advantage from the crisis" that had occurred in the Balkans in 1875. Therefore, Bismarck claimed impartiality on behalf of Germany at the Congress, which enabled him to preside over the negotiations with a keen eye for foul play.

Though most of Europe went into the Congress expecting a diplomatic show, much like the Congress of Vienna, they were to be sadly disappointed. Bismarck, unhappy to be conducting the Congress in the heat of the summer, had a short temper and a low tolerance for malarky. Thus, any grandstanding was cut short by the testy German chancellor. The ambassadors from the small Balkan territories whose fate was being decided were barely even allowed to attend the diplomatic meetings, which were between mainly the representatives of the great powers.

According to Henry Kissinger, the congress saw a shift in Bismarck's Realpolitik. Until then, as Germany had become too powerful for isolation, his policy was to maintain the League of the Three Emperors. Now that he could no longer rely on Russia's alliance, he began to form relations with as many potential enemies as possible.

Legacy 

Bowing to Russia's pressure, Romania, Serbia and Montenegro were all declared independent principalities. Russia kept Southern Bessarabia, which it had annexed in the Russo-Turkish War, but the Bulgarian state that it had created was first bisected and then divided again into the Principality of Bulgaria and Eastern Rumelia, both of which were given nominal autonomy, under the control of the Ottoman Empire. Bulgaria was promised autonomy, and guarantees were made against Turkish interference, but they were largely ignored. Romania received Northern Dobruja. Montenegro obtained Nikšić, along with the primary Albanian regions of Podgorica, Bar and Plav-Gusinje. The Ottoman government, or Porte, agreed to obey the specifications contained in the Organic Law of 1868 and to guarantee the civil rights of non-Muslim subjects. The region of Bosnia-Herzegovina was handed over to the administration of Austria-Hungary, which also obtained the right to garrison the Sanjak of Novi Pazar, a small border region between Montenegro and Serbia. Bosnia and Herzegovina were put on the fast track to eventual annexation. Russia agreed that Macedonia, the most important strategic section of the Balkans, was too multinational to be part of Bulgaria and permitted it to remain under the Ottoman Empire. Eastern Rumelia, which had its own large Turkish and Greek minorities, became an autonomous province under a Christian ruler, with its capital at Philippopolis. The remaining portions of the original "Greater Bulgaria" became the new state of Bulgaria.

In Russia, the Congress of Berlin was considered to be a dismal failure. After finally defeating the Turks despite many past inconclusive Russo-Turkish wars, many Russians had expected "something colossal", a redrawing of the Balkan borders in support of Russian territorial ambitions. Instead, the victory resulted in an Austro-Hungarian gain on the Balkan front that was brought about by the rest of the European powers' preference for a powerful Austria-Hungarian Empire, which threatened basically no one, to a powerful Russia, which had been locked in competition with Britain in the so-called Great Game for most of the century. Gorchakov said, "I consider the Berlin Treaty the darkest page in my life". Most Russian people furious over the European repudiation of their political gains, and though there was some thought that it represented only a minor stumble on the road to Russian hegemony in the Balkans, it actually gave Bosnia-Herzegovina and Serbia over to Austria-Hungary's sphere of influence and essentially removed all Russian influence from the area.

The Serbs were upset with "Russia... consenting to the cession of Bosnia to Austria":

Italy was dissatisfied with the results of the Congress, and the tensions between Greece and the Ottoman Empire were left unresolved. Bosnia-Herzegovina would also prove to be problematic for the Austro-Hungarian Empire in later decades. The League of the Three Emperors, established in 1873, was destroyed since Russia saw lack of German support on the issue of Bulgaria's full independence as a breach of loyalty and the alliance. The border between Greece and Turkey was not resolved. In 1881, after protracted negotiations, a compromise border was accepted after a naval demonstration of the great powers had resulted in the cession of Thessaly and the Arta Prefecture to Greece.

Thus, the Berlin Congress sowed the seeds of further conflicts, including the Balkan Wars and (ultimately) the First World War. In the 'Salisbury Circular' of 1 April 1878, the British Foreign Secretary, the Marquess of Salisbury, clarified the objections of him and the government to the Treaty of San Stefano because of the favorable position in which it left Russia.

In 1954, the British historian A. J. P. Taylor wrote:

Though the Congress of Berlin constituted a harsh blow to Pan-Slavism, it, by no means, solved the question of the area. The Slavs in the Balkans were still mostly under non-Slavic rule, split between the rule of Austria-Hungary and the ailing Ottoman Empire. The Slavic states of the Balkans had learned that banding together as Slavs benefited them less than playing to the desires of a neighboring great power. That damaged the unity of the Balkan Slavs and encouraged competition between the fledgling Slav states.

The underlying tensions of the region would continue to simmer for thirty years until they again exploded in the Balkan Wars of 1912–1913. In 1914, the assassination of Franz Ferdinand, the Austro-Hungarian heir, led to the First World War. In hindsight, the stated goal of maintaining peace and balance of powers in the Balkans obviously failed since the region would remain a source of conflict between the great powers well into the 20th century.

Internal opposition to Andrássy's objectives
Austro-Hungarian Foreign Minister Gyula Andrássy and the occupation and administration of Bosnia-Herzegovina also obtained the right to station garrisons in the Sanjak of Novi Pazar, which remained under Ottoman administration. The Sanjak preserved the separation of Serbia and Montenegro, and the Austro-Hungarian garrisons there would open the way for a dash to Salonika that "would bring the western half of the Balkans under permanent Austrian influence". "High [Austro-Hungarian] military authorities desired... [an] immediate major expedition with Salonika as its objective".

On 28 September 1878 the Finance Minister, Koloman von Zell, threatened to resign if the army, behind which stood the Archduke Albert, were allowed to advance to Salonika. In the session of the Hungarian Parliament of 5 November 1878 the Opposition proposed that the Foreign Minister should be impeached for violating the constitution by his policy during the Near East Crisis and by the occupation of Bosnia-Herzegovina. The motion was lost by 179 to 95. By the Opposition rank and file the gravest accusations were raised against Andrassy.

Delegates

United Kingdom 
 Benjamin Disraeli Earl of Beaconsfield (Prime Minister)
 Marquess of Salisbury (Foreign Secretary)
 Baron Ampthill (Ambassador to Germany)

Russia 
 Prince Gorchakov (Foreign Minister)
 Count Shuvalov (Ambassador to Great Britain) 
 Baron d'Oubril (Ambassador to Germany)

Germany 
 Otto von Bismarck (Chancellor) 
 Prince Hohenlohe (Ambassador to France)
 Bernhard Ernst von Bülow (State Secretary for Foreign Affairs)

Austria-Hungary 
 Count Andrássy (Foreign Minister)
 Count Károlyi (Ambassador to Germany)
 Baron Heinrich Karl von Haymerle (Ambassador to Italy)

France 
 Monsieur Waddington (Foreign Minister) 
 Comte de Saint-Vallier
 Monsieur Desprey

Kingdom of Italy 
 Count Corti (Foreign Minister)
 Count De Launay

Ottoman Empire 
 Karatheodori Pasha
 Sadullah Pasha
 Mehmed Ali Pasha
 Catholicos Mkrtich Khrimian (representing Armenian population)

Romania 
 Ion C. Brătianu
 Mihail Kogălniceanu

Greece 
 Theodoros Deligiannis

Serbia 
 Jovan Ristić

Montenegro 
 Božo Petrović
 Stanko Radonjić

Albanians in the Congress 	
 Abdyl Frasheri 	
 Jani Vreto

See also
 International relations of the Great Powers (1814–1919)

  Berlin Conference (1884)

Notes

References and further reading
 
 Djordjevic, Dimitrije.  "The Berlin Congress of 1878 and the Origins of World War I". Serbian Studies (1998) 12 #1 pp 1–10.
 
 
 
 Medlicott, William Norton. Congress of Berlin and After (1963)
 
 Millman, Richard. Britain and the Eastern Question, 1875–78 (1979)
 
 Seton-Watson, R.W. Disraeli, Gladstone, and the Eastern question: a study in diplomacy and party politics (1935) pp  431–89. online

External links 
 

1878 conferences
1878 in Germany
1878 in international relations
19th century in Berlin
19th-century diplomatic conferences
Diplomatic conferences in Germany
History of the Balkans
July 1878 events
June 1878 events
Late modern Europe